An annotated list of popular/famous dancers.

A 
Ayo & Teo, duo of dancers and musicians from Ann Arbor, Michigan.
Fred Astaire ( – ), American film and Broadway stage dancer, choreographer, singer, musician and actor. He was an innovator in dance. He made 31 musical films, 10 featuring his dances with Ginger Rogers,  and was honored with the fifth Greatest Male Star of All Time by the American Film Institute.

B
George Balanchine ( – ), Georgian ballet choreographer. He is one of the 20th century's foremost choreographers, and one of the founders of American ballet. His work formed a bridge between classical and modern ballet.
Sara Baras (born 1971), female Flamenco Dancer, born in the port of Cadiz.
Mikhail Baryshnikov (born ), Soviet-born Russian American dancer, choreographer, and actor.
Rodney Bell (born 1971), known for physically integrated dance.
Bez (born ), renowned as the dancer for the Happy Mondays.
Vytautas Beliajus ( – September 1994), considered the father of international folk dancing in the United States.
Carlo Blasis ( – ), Italian dancer, choreographer and dance theoretician.
Chrystelle Trump Bond, ( – ) American dancer, choreographer, and dance historian
AC Bonifacio (born 2002), Filipino-Canadian actress, singer, model and dancer
Anise Boyer (1914–2008), American dancer who was part of the Cotton Club chorus line during the Harlem Renaissance and traveled with Cab Calloway's band
James Brown ( – ), commonly referred to as "The Godfather of Soul", "Mr. Dynamite", the "King of Funk", "Soul Brother #1" and "The Hardest Working Man in Show Business", was an American entertainer (singer and dancer). He is recognized as one of the most influential figures in 20th-century popular music and was renowned for his vocals and feverish dancing.
Jean Butler (born ), Irish step dancer.

C
Raymond & Joyce Callis, English ballroom dancing champions
Don Campbell (1951 – March 30, 2020), American dancer
Leslie Caron, French dancer and actress in many motion pictures
Enrico Cecchetti (21 June 1850, Rome13 November 1928, Milan), Italian ballet dancer, founder of the Cecchetti method.
Vernon and Irene Castle, husband-and-wife team of ballroom dancers of the early 20th century. 
Paul Christiano (1976–2015), American dancer and choreographer. Started out as a gymnast, then moved into dance. He was Chicago Magazine "Dancer of the year" 2003 and one of Time Outs "Dancing Men of 2010"
Ciara, American singer, songwriter, dancer, and choreographer. She is best known for her hip-hop style and contemporary dance choreography.
Bessie Clayton (c. 1875–1948), considered the mother of American toe-tap dancing.
Jack Cole (1911–1974), American dancer, choreographer, and theatre director known as the father of theatrical jazz dance.
Dean Collins (May 29, 1917 – June 1, 1984), American dancer, instructor, choreographer, and innovator of swing. He is often credited with bringing swing dance, or Lindy Hop, from New York to Southern California.
Misty Copeland (born September 10, 1982) American ballet dancer for American Ballet Theatre (ABT), one of the three leading classical ballet companies in the United States. On June 30, 2015, Copeland became the first African American woman to be promoted to principal dancer in ABT's 75-year history.
Jean Coralli (1779–1854), French dancer and choreographer and later held the esteemed post of First Balletmaster of the Paris Opera Ballet. He is best known for the creation of the Romantic ballet Giselle which he choreographed in tandem with another French dancer, Jules Perrot.
Joaquín Cortés (born February 22, 1969), classically trained ballet and flamenco dancer from Spain of Roma origin.
Julius Brewster Cotton, the first African-American to join El Taller Coreografic de la UNAM in Mexico 
Merce Cunningham ( – ) American dancer and choreographer.

D
Tabitha and Napoleon D'umo, also known as Nappytabs, are choreographers and creative directors who are credited with developing the new style of hip-hop dance known as lyrical hip-hop.
Alex Da Silva (born 27 March 1968), Brazilian dancer and choreographer, specializing in Salsa dancing. Da Silva is also known for being a recurring guest choreographer on the Fox TV show So You Think You Can Dance.
 Astad Deboo (1947–2020), Indian dancer-choreographer, who has mixed a modern and contemporary dance styles, with Indian classical dance forms of Kathak and Kathakali in which he has trained, to create style unique to him.
 Nicole de Weever (born 1979), Sint Maarten dancer and choreographer
Sergei Pavlovich Diaghilev (March 31, 1872 – August 19, 1929), Russian art critic, patron, ballet impresario and founder of the Ballets Russes from which many famous dancers and choreographers would later arise.
Charles-Louis Didelot (27 March 1767 – 7 November 1837), French dancer and choreographer.
Lucinda Dickey (born August 14, 1960), American dancer and actress who is best known for her role as Kelly in the 1984 cult film Breakin’ and the 1984 sequel, Breakin’ 2: Electric Boogaloo. 
Doctor Ice, influenced Hip-Hop dancing to a new form. His influence can be noted by the dance moves in videos done by artists such as Kid N Play, Scrap Lover and Scoop Lover (dancers for Big Daddy Kane) and G-Wiz and the late Trouble T-Roy (from Heavy D & The Boyz).
Isadora Duncan (May 27, 1877 – September 14, 1927), American dancer. She was born Angela Isadora Duncan in San Francisco, California, and is considered by many to be the mother of Modern Dance. Although never very popular in the United States, she entertained throughout Europe.
Katherine Mary Dunham (June 22, 1909 – May 21, 2006), American dancer, choreographer, songwriter, author, educator and activist who was trained as an anthropologist. Dunham had one of the most successful dance careers in American and European theater of the 20th century and has been called the Matriarch and Queen Mother of Black Dance.
Shabba Doo (1955–2020), American actor, dancer, choreographer, and director. He has appeared in film and television. He became one of the founders of hip hop dancing as a member of The Original Lockers. He is one of the pioneers the dance style commonly known as "locking".
Tia Doca (1932–2009), Brazilian samba dancer and singer

E
Amera Eid, Australian belly dancer and owner of an Australian belly dance school, Amera's Palace. Eid opened Amera's Palace belly dance boutique in 1987, which included one of the first belly dance schools in Sydney.
Fanny Elssler (23 June 1810 – 27 November 1884), Austrian dancer.
Makhmud Esambayev (15 July 1924 – 7 January 2000), Soviet Chechen actor and dancer.
Norberto Esbrez (1966–2014), Argentinian tango dancer, choreographer, and teacher of tango nuevo. He is known as El Pulpo or octopus for his fluid and intricate leg moves.

F
Eugene Louis Faccuito (March 20, 1925 – April 7, 2015), American jazz dancer, choreographer, teacher and innovator who is best known for creating a jazz exercise technique.
Lusi Faiva, known for physically integrated dance (New Zealand)
Antonio Fini (born March 26, 1983), Italian dancer, choreographer, educator and producer.
Michael Ryan Flatley (born July 16, 1958), Irish step dancer from the south side of the country.
Flying Steps, German breakdance crew, founded in 1993.
Cristina Wistari Formaggia (August 27, 1945 – July 19, 2008), a key participant in the preservation and dissemination of Balinese dance.
Bob Fosse (June 23, 1927 – September 23, 1987), dancer, actor, film director, film editor, screenwriter, and most notably a groundbreaking jazz/musical theatre choreographer. He won eight tony awards for choreography. His unique and famous style has been imitated and recreated over and over again throughout the world.
Michel Fokine (April 23, 1880August 22, 1942), groundbreaking Russian choreographer and dancer. Fokine staged more than 70 ballets in Europe and the United States.
Evan-Burrows Fontaine, American interpretive dancer and Ziegfeld Follies performer.
Dame Margot Fonteyn (18 May 191921 February 1991), widely regarded as England's greatest ballerina, stage partner and friend of Rudolf Nureyev for many years.
William Forsythe (born December 30, 1949), American dancer and choreographer resident in Dresden in Saxony. He is known internationally for his work with the Frankfurt Ballet and his reorientation of classical ballet.
Joe Frisco (November 4, 1889 – February 12, 1958), American vaudeville performer who first made his name on stage as a jazz dancer, but later incorporated his stuttering voice to his act and became a popular comedian. Frisco was a mainstay on the vaudeville circuit in the 1920s and 1930s. He made his Broadway debut in the Florenz Ziegfeld Follies in 1918.
Chicho Frumboli, one of the most famous Argentine Tango dancers. He is best known for his improvisation skills, and is regarded as one of the founders of Tango nuevo. He usually dances in this open style but is at ease when dancing close. He performed among others with Gotan Project, Tanghetto and Narcotango.
Loie Fuller (January 15, 1862 – January 1, 1928), pioneer of both modern dance and theatrical lighting techniques.

G
Antonio Gades (November 14, 1936 – July 20, 2004), Spanish flamenco dancer and choreographer. He helped to popularize the art form on the international stage.
Samia Gamal (1924 – December 1, 1994), Egyptian belly dancer and film actress. In 1949, Egypt's King Farouk proclaimed Samia Gamal "The National Dancer of Egypt", which brought US attention to the dancer.
Pavel Andreyevich Gerdt, also known as Paul Gerdt (near St. Peterburg, Russia, 22 November 1844 – Vamaloki, Finland 12 August 1917), was the Premier Danseur Noble of the Imperial Ballet, the Bolshoi Kamenny Theatre, and the Mariinsky Theatre for 56 years, making his debut in 1860, and retiring in 1916. 
Gus Giordano (1923 – March 9, 2008), American jazz dancer.
Savion Glover (born November 19, 1973), American actor, tap dancer, and choreographer.
Martha Graham (May 11, 1894 – April 1, 1991), American dancer and choreographer regarded as one of the foremost pioneers of modern dance, and is widely considered one of the greatest artists of the 20th century.

H
MC Hammer (Stanley Kirk Burrell born March 30, 1962), American emcee and hip-hop dancer, most popular during the late 1980s to mid-1990s.
Erick Hawkins (April 23, 1909 – November 23, 1994), American dancer and choreographer.
Sir Robert Helpmann (9 April 1909 – 28 September 1986), Australian dancer, actor, theatre director, and choreographer. Co-director of the Australian Ballet during the 1960s and 1970s.
Tatsumi Hijikata (March 9, 1928 – January 21, 1986), Japanese choreographer, and the founder of a genre of dance performance art called Butoh.
Gregory Oliver Hines (February 14, 1946 – August 9, 2003), American actor, singer, dancer and choreographer.
Hong 10 (born 16 February 1985 in South Korea), male South Korean B-Boy.
Lester Horton (January 23, 1906 – November 2, 1953), American dancer, choreographer, and teacher.
 Dore Hoyer (12 December 1911 – 31 December 1967), a German expressionist dancer and choreographer credited as "one of the most important solo dancers of the Ausdruckstanz tradition."
Finola Hughes (born 29 October 1959), English dancer and actress, most noted for her appearance in the 1983 film Staying Alive.
Doris Batcheller Humphrey (October 17, 1895 – December 29, 1958), dancer of the early 20th century.

J
Janet Jackson (born May 16, 1966), American singer and entertainer.
Michael Jackson (August 29, 1958 – June 25, 2009), American musician and entertainer, often cited by various media outlets as the "World's Best Dancer".
Robert Joffrey (1930–1988), American dancer, teacher, producer, and choreographer, known for his highly imaginative modern ballets.
Sabra Elise Johnson (born July 29, 1987), dancer from Roy, Utah, and the most recent champion of the Fox reality television show So You Think You Can Dance. She has the distinction of being the first female and person of African-American descent to win the title.
Thomas Johnson (better known as Tommy the Clown), American dancer, best known as the inventor of the "clowning" style of dance, which evolved into the popular "krumping" style. Johnson invented the style in 1992, to enhance birthday party clown acts, thereby creating the concept of "hip-hop clowns". Johnson and his followers have performed at birthday parties ranging from inner city communities to celebrities like Madonna, Pamela Anderson, and Cedric the Entertainer.
Tamsier Joof (born May 17, 1973), British dancer and choreographer trained in classical ballet, jazz, tap, contemporary, African and voguing. Tamsier is one of the early London voguers. He is of a Senegalese and Gambian descent.

K
Kunwar Amarjeet Singh (born 16 March 1984), modern dancer and choreographer from India. He is known for his hip-hop dancing styles, mainly the old-School genre, and for his Bollywood style, especially partner dancing or group dancing.

Malika (Mazol) Yashuvayevna Kolontarova (born September 5, 1950) is a Tajik Bukharian Jewish dancer. She earned the titles of People's Artist of USSR, People's Artist of Tajikistan and Honored Artist of Tajikistan (the highest titles given in her native nation).
Tamara Platonovna Karsavina (March 10, 1885May 26, 1978), famous Russian ballerina who eventually settled in England, where she helped create the Royal Academy of Dance in 1920.
Eugene Curran Kelly (August 23, 1912February 2, 1996), better known as Gene Kelly, was an Emmy Award-winning American dancer, actor, singer, director, producer and choreographer.
Lilliana Ketchman (born June 23, 2008), American dancer, actress, model and singer who is most known for her role on the reality show, Dance Moms.
Alonzo King, American dancer and choreographer working in San Francisco, California. He is known for founding a contemporary ballet company, Alonzo King LINES Ballet, in 1982.
Jiří Kylián (born 1947), Czech dance choreographer. Kylián studied in Prague, as well as at the Royal Ballet School in London. He joined the Stuttgart Ballet in 1968 and worked under John Cranko, where he began to choreograph. Kylián became artistic director of Nederlands Dans Theatre in 1976.
Maria Kochetkova (born 1984 in Moscow), principal dancer with the San Francisco Ballet. Kochetkova studied at the Bolshoi School in Moscow, and danced with the Royal Ballet and English National Ballet School.
Kamo Mphela (born November 29, 1999), South African dancer and singer.

L
Rudolf Laban (December 15, 1879 – July 1, 1958), notable, central European dance artist and theorist, whose work laid the foundations for Laban Movement Analysis, and other more specific developments.
Eddie Ladd, award-winning Welsh contemporary dancer, known for her controversial themes and presentation style.
Walter Laird (26 July 192030 May 2002), Dancesport World Champion in Professional Latin. He is the author of the Technique of Latin American Dancing, and coached many dancer champions including Allan Tornsberg, Vibeke Toft, Espen Salberg, Jukka Haapalainen and Sirpa Suutari.
Last For One, break dancing crew that formed in 1997. With their win in the 2005 Battle of the Year, they have been recognized as a worldwide known name and a contributor to the Korean wave, their fans respectively calling them the 'Dancing Taeguk Warriors.
Nick Lazzarini (born 1984), first season winner of the Fox reality show So You Think You Can Dance.
Nikolai Legat (1869–1937), dancer with the Russian Imperial Ballet from 1888 to 1914 and was the main successor to the roles of the great ballet dancer, Pavel Gerdt.
Lawrence Leritz (born September 26, 1962), American dancer and choreographer.
Les Twins, French dance duo composed of identical twin brothers Larry and Laurent Bourgeois (born December 6, 1988).
Sonia Destri Lie (Brazil) Sonia Destri Lie, often known simply as Sonia Destri, Brazilian dancer and choreographer. In 2005, she formed Companhia Urbana de Dança, a hip hop group, which has achieved increasing international recognition.
Māris Liepa (27 July 1936, Riga26 March 1989, Moscow), Latvian ballet dancer.
Lil' C (born Christopher A. Toler in January 1983), American dancer and choreographer. He has choreographed for So You Think You Can Dance, along with many top music icons.
José Limón (1908–1972), pioneering modern dancer and choreographer. He was born in Culiacán Mexico and the eldest of 12 children. He moved to New York City in 1928 where he studied under Doris Humphrey and Charles Weidman. In 1946, Limón founded the José Limón Dance Company. His most famous dance is The Moor's Pavane (1949), based on Shakespeare's Othello.
Chloe Lukasiak (born May 25, 2001), American actress, dancer, author, model and reality TV star most known for starring on the reality show, Dance Moms.
Jennifer Lopez (born July 24, 1969), often referred to as J. Lo, is an American actress, singer and dancer. Jennifer Lopez is known for her upbeat pop songs and Latin-pop influenced dancing abilities.
La Argentina (September 4, 1890July 18, 1936), Argentine-born Spanish dancer.

M
Madonna (born August 16, 1958), American recording artist, actress and dancer. Her controversially successful career has made her one of the best selling artists of all time and one of the world's most influential dancers.
Madhuri Dixit, Indian actress, producer, television personality, trained classical dancers and one of the leading actresses in Bollywood.
Natalia Makarova (born November 21, 1940), Soviet-Russian prima ballerina. The History of Dance, published in 1981, notes that “Her performances set standards of artistry and aristocracy of dance which mark her as the finest ballerina of her generation.” She has also won awards as an actress and continues to stage classical ballets throughout the world.
Frankie Manning (1914–2009), American dancer, instructor and choreographer. Manning is considered to be one of the founding fathers of Lindy Hop.
Mario Maya, recognized as one of the greatest flamenco dancers and choreographers of all times. He is the father of Belen Maya, one of the main figures of contemporary flamenco dance.
Norma Miller (December 2, 1919 – May 5, 2019), American swing dancer known as The Queen of Swing. 
Mata Hari, stage name of Margaretha Geertruida Zelle (7 August 1876 – 15 October 1917), a Dutch exotic dancer and courtesan who was executed by firing squad for espionage during World War I. Many books have been written about Mata Hari, some of them serious historical and biographical accounts, and many of them highly speculative.
Ann Miller (April 12, 1923January 22, 2004), American dancer, singer and actress.
Jewel McGowan, dancer of Lindy Hop, a form of swing dance, in the 1940s and 1950s. She is known among dance aficionados as the frequent partner of dancer Dean Collins. Jewel was considered by her fellow Los Angeles dancers to be the best female swing dancer who ever lived.
Baisali Mohanty, Indian classical dancer and choreographer of Indian dancing style Odissi. Widely regarded as one of the most promising dancer of her generation, Baisali has been performing along with her own dance company "Baisali Mohanty & Troupe" for over a decade in major International and national festivals.
Alex Moore (1901–1991), pioneer of modern ballroom dancing, a dancer, dance teacher and author of classical ballroom dancing books. His Ballroom Dancing is considered to be the "Bible" of International-style ballroom dancing.
Mary Murphy (born March 9, 1958), ballroom dance champion, accredited dance judge, and a regular judge and choreographer on the FOX dance competition-reality show So You Think You Can Dance. Mary Murphy is a former U.S. champion ballroom dancer and TV personality. She was born in Lancaster, Ohio, the only daughter in an Irish family of four children. She graduated from Northwest High School in Canal Fulton, Ohio.

N
Nellie Navette (1865–1936), British dancer, singer and comedienne of the late 19th and early 20th-centuries who performed in music hall, variety and pantomime..
The Nicholas Brothers, African-American team of dancing brothers, Fayard Nicholas (1914–2006) and Harold Nicholas (1921–2000). With their highly acrobatic technique, high level of artistry and daring innovations, they were considered by many the greatest tap dancers of their day.
Vaslav Fomich Nijinsky (March 12, 1889April 8, 1950), Polish ballet dancer and choreographer. Nijinsky was one of the most gifted male dancers in history, and he became celebrated for his virtuosity and for the depth and intensity of his characterizations. He could perform en pointe, a rare skill among male dancers at the time (Albright, 2004) and his ability to perform seemingly gravity-defying leaps was also legendary.
Rudolf Nureyev (March 17, 1938 – January 6, 1993), regarded as one of the greatest male ballet dancers of the 20th century, alongside Maris Liepa, Vaslav Nijinsky, Alexander Godunov and Mikhail Baryshnikov.

O
Donald O'Connor (August 28, 1925September 27, 2003), American tap dancer. He appeared alongside Peggy Ryan in several Universal Studios musicals throughout the 1940s. Several years later, he appeared with Gene Kelly and Debbie Reynolds in the 1952 film classic Singin' in the Rain.
Ann-Margret Olsson, Swedish-American woman who is famous for dancing, acting and singing in many American motion pictures, including Viva Las Vegas.
Simona Orinska (born August 18, 1978), only butoh artist in Latvia and a multidisciplinary artist: contemporary dancer, poet, director and choreographer of many art projects. She is also a Dance Therapy or Dance Movement Therapy practitioner.
Cristian Oviedo (born November 19, 1979), professional dancer, dance instructor, and choreographer.

P
Anna Pavlovna Pavlova (12 February 188123 January 1931), famous Russian ballerina of the late 19th and the early 20th century. Pavlova is a largely remembered for her famous dance The Dying Swan and because she was the first ballerina to travel around the world and bring ballet to people who had never seen it.
Pepita de Oliva (1830–1871), Romani Spanish dancer who performed across Europe
Jules-Joseph Perrot (August 18, 1810August 18, 1892), French dancer and choreographer who later became Balletmaster of the Imperial Ballet in St. Petersburg, Russia.
Arlene Phillips OBE, English choreographer and former dancer. Has staged numerous musicals in the West End and Broadway; winning or being nominated for a number of prestigious awards including the Laurence Olivier Award and the Tony Award. Is most noted as a television dance expert, judging shows such as Strictly Come Dancing and So You Think You Can Dance.
Ommi Pipit-Suksun, Thai ballerina, former soloist with the San Francisco Ballet and former principal dancer with Ballet San Jose.
Juanita Pitts, African-American tap dancer who performed in the 1930s to the 1950s
Maya Plisetskaya (1925–2015), Russian ballet dancer, choreographer, ballet director, and actress, who is considered one of the greatest ballerinas of the 20th century. Since 1960 she was the prima ballerina assoluta of the Bolshoi Theatre.
Eleanor Torrey Powell (November 21, 1912February 11, 1982), American dancer and actress. Best remembered for her tap dance numbers in musical films in the 1930s and 1940s.
Prince (June 7, 1958April 21, 2016), American singer-songwriter, multi-instrumentalist, dancer, and record producer. He was a musical innovator who was known for his eclectic work, flamboyant stage presence, extravagant dress and makeup, and wide vocal range. His music integrates a wide variety of styles, including funk, rock, R&B, new wave, soul, psychedelia, and pop.
Juliet Prowse (1941–1996), South African-American dancer who was famous for dancing, acting, and singing in many American motion pictures, including G.I. Blues along with Elvis Presley.

R
Dame Marie Rambert (20 February 188812 June 1982), Polish-Jewish dancer and dance pedagogue who exerted a great influence on British ballet, both as a dancer and teacher.
Wade Robson (born September 17, 1982), Australian dancer, choreographer, producer and songwriter.
Pierre Rameau (1674–1748), French dancing master to Elisabetta Farnese, and the author of two books that now provide us with valuable information about Baroque dance.
Bill Robinson (May 25, 1878November 25, 1949), also known as Bojangles, pioneer and pre-eminent African-American tap dance performer.
 Ginger Rogers (July 16, 1911 – April 25, 1995), American dancer, actress, and singer during the Golden Age of Hollywood, known for dancing in 10 feature films with Fred Astaire. 
Peggy Ryan (August 29, 1924October 30, 2004), American dancer and starred in several Universal Studios musicals in the 1940s with Donald O'Connor, such as Mister Big, What's Cookin'?, and Patrick the Great, their last film together.
Hrithik Roshan (born 10 January 1974), Indian actor who appears in Bollywood films. He has portrayed a variety of characters and is known for his dancing skills

S
Adam G. Sevani (born June 29, 1992), actor as well as a dancer. Known as Moose from Step Up 2: The Streets and its sequel, Step Up 3D. Adam and director of Step Up 2, Jon Chu, and their dance group ACDC or Adam/Chu Dance Crew, had challenged pop star Miley Cyrus to a highly publicized dance battle. 
Ruth St. Denis (January 20, 1879July 21, 1968), early modern dance pioneer.
Benjiman "Benji" Daniel Schwimmer (born January 18, 1984), American professional swing dancer. On August 16, 2006, he was crowned "America's Favorite Dancer", as the winner of the second season of So You Think You Can Dance.
Uday Shankar (December 8, 1900September 26, 1977), the pioneer of modern dance in India, and a world renowned Indian dancer and choreographer
Lloyd Shaw (1890–1958), also known as Dr. Lloyd "Pappy" Shaw, was an educator, and is generally credited with bringing about the broad revival of square dancing in America.
 Ted Shawn (October 21, 1891 – January 9, 1972), a pioneer of American modern dance. who created the Denishawn School together with his wife Ruth St. Denis. 
Jimmy Slyde (1927–2008), who is known as the King of Slides, is a world-renowned tap dancer, especially famous for his innovative tap style mixed with jazz. Slyde's profile in the United States revived noticeably in the 1980s.
"Shorty" George Snowden was an African American dancer in Harlem during the 1920s and 1930s. He is popularly credited with coining the name "Lindy Hop" for a popular partner swing dance of the day.
Britney Spears (born December 2, 1981), American singer and dancer. Apart from being famous for her hit singles "...Baby One More Time" and "Oops!...I Did It Again", she is known internationally for her unique outfits and her entertaining and freestyle dancing.
John William Sublett (February 19, 1902 – May 18, 1986), known by his stage name John W. Bubbles, was an American vaudeville performer, singer and entertainer. Sublett is known as the father of "rhythm tap", a form of tap dance.
Sylvia Sykes, swing dance instructor, judge and choreographer. In particular, she is considered by most to be the leading authority on the dance Balboa.
Shantanu Maheshwari (born March 7, 1991), Indian actor, dancer, and choreographer.
Shakti Mohan, contemporary dancer from India.
Super Junior, Korean mutli-talented boy band under the company SM Entertainment. They performed Twins for their debut in 2005.

T
Marie Taglioni (April 23, 1804April 24, 1884), famous Italian ballerina of the Romantic ballet era, a central figure in the history of European dance.
Layla Taj, Egyptian belly dancer whose dances communicate aspects of Egyptian traditions and culture.
Twyla Tharp (born July 1, 1941), leading American dancer and choreographer. She has won Emmy and Tony awards, and currently works as a choreographer in New York City.
Lisa Joann Thompson (born April 22, 1969), American dancer and choreographer, best known for staring as a Fly Girl on the In Living Color television show.
Danny Tidwell (born August 1, 1984), American contemporary and ballet dancer and choreographer, best known for being the runner-up on Fox's third season of So You Think You Can Dance in 2007.
Eddie Torres (born July 3, 1950), famed salsa dance instructor.
Antony Tudor (4 April 1908 – 19 April 1987), born William Cook, influential 20th-century English ballet choreographer, teacher and dancer.

U 
Galina Ulanova (  21 March 1998), Russian ballet dancer. She is frequently cited as being one of the greatest ballerinas of the 20th century. From 1944 to 1960 she was the prima ballerina assoluta of the Bolshoi Theater.

V
Agrippina Yakovlevna Vaganova (July 6, 1879November 5, 1951), Russian ballet teacher who developed the Vaganova method - the technique which derived from the teaching methods of the old Imperial Ballet School (today the Vaganova Academy of Russian Ballet)
Vijay, multi-talented dancer in Indian cinema

W
John Weaver (July 21, 1673September 24, 1760), English dancer and choreographer and is commonly known as the father of English pantomime.
Charles Weidman (1901 Lincoln, Nebraska1975), American modern dancer, choreographer and teacher.
Elliana Walmsley (born June 23, 2007), American dancer, actress and model who is most known for starring on the reality show, Dance Moms.
Mary Wigman (1886–1973), German dancer, choreographer, and instructor of dance. Credited for innovation of expressionist dance, and pioneer of modern dance in Germany.
G. Hepburn Wilson (1875–?), proponent of jazz dancing 
Katja Wulff (1890–1992), German-Swiss expressionist dancer and dance instructor.
Leni Wylliams (1961-1996), African-American dancer/choreographer/master-teacher.

Y
Nellie Yu Roung Ling (1889–1973), Chinese dancer and choreographer, considered the first modern dancer of China.
 Sada Yacco (July 18, 1871–December 7, 1946), a Japanese geisha, actress, and dancer.

Z
Mackenzie Ziegler (born June 4, 2004), American dancer, singer, author, and actress who is most known for her role on the reality show, Dance Moms.
Maddie Ziegler (born September 30, 2002), American dancer, actress and model who is most known for her role on the reality show, Dance Moms, as well as the main dancer in the music videos for Australian singer-songwriter Sia.
Lahcen Zinoun (born 1944), Moroccan choreographer, dancer and filmmaker; considered the greatest contemporary Moroccan choreographer.

See also
 Women in dance
List of female dancers
List of Indian women in dance
 List of African-American ballerinas
 List of Russian ballet dancers
 Prima ballerina assoluta
 List of prima ballerinas
 List of So You Think You Can Dance finalists

References

Dance-related lists
Lists of people by occupation